Guido Valadares (born 12 June 1934 in Dili; died 30 August 1976) was a Timorese politician and independence activist. He was a member of FRETILIN National Committee and the Vice-Minister of Labor and Social Welfare of the FRETILIN government in 1975". In 2003, the national hospital of East Timor was renamed in his honor, Guido Valadares National Hospital.

References

1976 deaths
1934 births
People from Dili
Fretilin politicians